The Last Protest Singer is a posthumously produced album by the American singer-songwriter Harry Chapin, released in 1988. Chapin had been working on the album when he died in 1981. Up to 18 songs were on the master tape to a greater or lesser extent. Eleven of these were far enough advanced to create this album.

The track listing on the Dunhill issue differs from that on the more recent Chapin Productions CD version, with Dunhill uniquely having 'Anthem'/'A Quiet Little Love Affair' and the Chapin Productions CD having 'Oh Man'.

According to Chapin, album's name and lead track is in memory of Chilean activist Víctor Jara, who sang during his torture before being murdered for protesting the 1973 Chilean coup d'état.

Track listing
"Last of the Protest Singers"
"November Rains"
"Basic Protest Song"
"Last Stand"
"Sounds Like America to Me"
"Word Wizard"
"Anthem"
"A Quiet Little Love Affair"
"I Don't Want to Be President"
"Silly Little Girl"
"You Own the Only Light"

Personnel
Harry Chapin – guitar, vocals
Clair Marlo – Producer, arranger, synthesizer
Tom Chapin – guitar
Grant Geissman – guitar
Jon Cobert – piano
Steve Chapin – piano
Pat Coil – piano
Bill Lanphier – bass guitar
John Wallace – bass guitar
Howie Fields – drums and percussion
M. B. Gordy – drums and percussion
Doug Walker – electric guitar
Jon Cobert – synthesizer

References

Harry Chapin albums
1988 albums
Albums published posthumously